Milena Mavrodieva (born 4 August 1974) is a Bulgarian former artistic gymnast who competed at the 1989 World Artistic Gymnastics Championships. She won a silver medal on vault at the 1989 European Championships and a bronze medal on floor at the 1990 European Championships.

References

1974 births
Living people
Bulgarian female artistic gymnasts